''Copadichromis'' sp. 'Virginalis Kajose' is a formally undescribed species of freshwater fish in the family Cichlidae. It is found in Malawi, Mozambique, and Tanzania, primarily in Lake Malawi. It is also present in the adjoining, recently formed Lake Malombe. It is abundant in parts of Lake Malawi and in Lake Malombe as well, in shallow waters, and has been a regionally important species for fisheries in both lakes.

References

sp. 'Virginalis Kajose'
Undescribed vertebrate species
Taxonomy articles created by Polbot